John Coates is a footballer who played as a goalkeeper in the Football League for Southport and Chester.

References

Chester City F.C. players
Southport F.C. players
Burscough F.C. players
Association football goalkeepers
English Football League players
Morecambe F.C. players
Skelmersdale United F.C. players
1944 births
Living people
Knowsley United F.C. players
English footballers